The Challenge is an Australian novel by E. V. Timms. It was the fifth in his Great South Land Saga of novels.

It is set in Australia during the 1850s.

Plot
In 1850s Australia, Miss Susan Leigh searches for her father.

References

External links
The Challenge at AustLit

1952 Australian novels
Novels set in the 1850s
Angus & Robertson books